Riegel-Malterdingen station is a station in Malterdingen on the municipal border with Riegel am Kaiserstuhl, which are both in the Emmendingen district of Baden-Württemberg, Germany. It was opened with the section of the Rhine Valley Railway from Offenburg to Freiburg on 1 August 1845.  The Kaiserstuhl Railway (Kaiserstuhlbahn) of the South German Railway Company (Süddeutsche Eisenbahn-Gesellschaft) has run from a nearby terminus to Endingen since 1894. A line that branches off in Riegel Ort and runs on the eastern edge of the Kaiserstuhl to Gottenheim was opened at the same time. The line to Endingen was extended to run to the west of the mountain to Breisach in 1895.

Name 
Colloquially, the Riegel-Malterdingen station is usually only called the DB-Bahnhof (DB station) locally. Until 2011 the station was officially called Riegel. The name was changed at the request of the municipality of Malterdingen.

Location 
Although the station building of Riegel-Malterdingen station is located to the west of the Rhine Valley Railway, it is still 2 km from the centre of Riegel. It is entirely in the municipality of Malterdingen, but on the border with Riegel. 

The tracks of the Kaiserstuhl Railway are located west of the DB station on Riegel territory, but there is no direct connection with the DB station. In the northern part of the station there is a connecting track to the Rhine Valley Railway.

History
With the construction of the state railway line of the Baden main line from Mannheim to Basel, the section from Offenburg to Freiburg was opened on 1 August 1845 and the municipality of Riegel was first connected to the rail network.
 
Since the station was located outside the town of Riegel, the Kaiserstuhl Railway was built in 1894 via Riegel am Kaiserstuhl Ort station to Endingen. A branch was opened from Riegel Ort to Gottenheim to connect with the Freiburg–Colmar railway. This was followed in 1895 by an extension of the line to Endingen to Breisach, where  there was a connection to Colmar in France via the Breisach railway bridge over the Rhine until it was destroyed in 1945.

The Kaiserstuhl Railway was long owned by the South German Railway Company (Süddeutsche Eisenbahn-Gesellschaft) and is now operated by Südwestdeutsche Verkehrs-Aktiengesellschaft.

At the beginning of September 2014, a large commuter parking lot was built on the eastern side of the station (in the territory of Malterdingen) for €416,000, which supplemented the existing parking lot on the west side of the station (in the territory of Riegel). The municipality of Malterdingen bore the full costs.

Layout 
Riegel-Malterdingen has three platforms split between two different sections. Platforms  1 and 2 are side platforms located on the Mannheim–Karlsruhe–Basel railway of Deutsche Bahn. The third platform, No. 11, is located across a parking lot from the station building and serves the single track of the Südwestdeutsche Verkehrs-Aktiengesellschaft's Kaiserstuhl Railway.

Rail services
Riegel-Malterdingen is located on the Rhine Valley Railway from Mannheim to Basel. A Regional-Express service and a Regionalbahn service both run hourly. The Kaiserstuhl Railway also runs every hour.

References

Railway stations in Baden-Württemberg
Mannheim–Karlsruhe–Basel railway
Railway stations in Germany opened in 1845
1845 establishments in Baden
Emmendingen (district)